Mirdeh may refer to:
 Mirdeh-ye Olya
 Mirdeh-ye Sofla

See also
 Mir Deh
 Mir Deh Rural District